Masaharu Kondo (born 13 January 1956) is a Japanese bureaucrat who is Director-General of the Cabinet Legislation Bureau.

References 

Living people
1956 births
University of Tokyo alumni
21st-century Japanese politicians
Japanese civil servants
Place of birth missing (living people)